Source Lake is a small lake in geographic Canisbay and Peck townships in the Unorganized South part of Nipissing District in Northeastern Ontario, Canada. It lies in southern Algonquin Provincial Park and is part of the Saint Lawrence River drainage basin. The river is the source of the Madawaska River, which flows via the Ottawa River to the Saint Lawrence River.

Camp Pathfinder, a boys' summer camp, is located on Source Lake.

See also
List of lakes in Ontario

References 

Other map sources:

Lakes of Nipissing District